The Brisbane River, running through Brisbane, Queensland, Australia, is crossed by fifteen major bridges, from the Sir Leo Hielscher Bridges downstream to the Centenary upstream. The river meanders through an urban area that comprises 2,562,000 people.

There are two smaller crossings in the west of Brisbane City in the suburb of Mount Crosby: the Mount Crosby Weir, and Colleges Crossing (which straddles the boundary between Brisbane and Ipswich).

Planning
A bridge downstream of the Victoria Bridge was part of a larger plan, devised by Professor Roger Hawken of the University of Queensland in the 1920s, for a series of bridges over the Brisbane River to alleviate congestion on Victoria Bridge and to divert traffic away from the Brisbane central business district.  The William Jolly Bridge was the first of the Hawken Plan bridges to be constructed.  Lack of funds precluded the construction of the downstream bridge at that time.  Initially plans called for a transporter bridge further downstream near New Farm.

In 1926 Kangaroo Point was recommended by the Brisbane City Council's Cross River Commission. Subsequently the bridge was constructed as a public works program during the Great Depression.  The cost was to be no more than £1.6 million.

Major bridges

Map

Future bridges 
In 2007 the Smart State Council announced plans for a series of new green mode bridges for Brisbane. New bridges include; 
a connection from Margaret Street near the Stock Exchange in the City to Thornton Street, Kangaroo Point. 
from Cairns Street, Kangaroo Point a new bridge will connect to the end of the floating riverwalk at Merthyr Road, New Farm.
 and from Merthyr Road, Teneriffe a new bridge will connect to Hardcaste Park, Hawthorne (near Lindsay Street). 
These new bridges will create a greenway corridor over 5 green bridges from Morningside, through Hawthorne, Teneriffe, New Farm, Kangaroo Point, City, Northbank, South Bank, Dutton Park and Boggo Road to the University of Queensland.

Crossings between the Centenary Bridge and Wivenhoe Dam
In addition to the existing bridges between Centenary Bridge and Wivenhoe Dam a number of others have been proposed.

The Goodna Bypass is designed to relieve congestion on the Ipswich Motorway and will have four new bridges over the river (but no access to or from the north-western suburbs). Land acquisitions were underway in 2010 to create the future transport corridor. As of 2010, there is no date or funding provided to commence the construction of the Goodna Bypass.

The Western Bypass would have included a crossing of the river but has been cancelled.

The existing crossings on this section of the river are listed below (note: coordinates are derived from Google Earth).

Crossings from Lake Wivenhoe to Moore

When Lake Wivenhoe is full the waters extend many kilometres up the river. The first crossing upstream from the lake is a high level bridge built in conjunction with the dam to raise the Esk Kilcoy Road well above the maximum level of the lake. Several minor crossings of this section of the river shown on maps are omitted from the list below. The omitted crossings belong to one of the following groups:
 Former low level crossings now covered (most of the time) by the waters of Lake Wivenhoe.
 Public or private roads that provide access to farms on the eastern side of the river.
 Private roads or tracks that link parts of farms that are astride the river.
The more significant crossings from Lake Wivenhoe to Moore are listed below.

Upstream from Moore
Linville Road follows the river from Moore through Linville to the Mount Stanley State Forest. It crosses the river 12 times between Linville and its end, where it splits into Western Branch Road and Eastern Branch Road. Western Branch Road follows the west branch of the river to its source in Elgin Vale State Forest, north-west of Mount Stanley, crossing it 28 times. Eastern Branch Road follows the east branch most of the way to its source south-east of Mount Stanley, crossing it about 20 times before it ends.

See also

List of bridges in Brisbane
For information about tunnels which cross the Brisbane River, please check the Brisbane River page.

References

External links 

 Historical Brisbane River Map - shows the positions of Brisbane bridges on the river
 Images of Brisbane bridges - a slideshow of historical images of Brisbane bridges from Picture Queensland, State Library of Queensland

 
 
Brisbane River
Brisbane River floods
Brisbane-related lists